The Bessa family of cameras was manufactured in Japan by Cosina as a revival of the Voigtländer brand name.

All the Cosina Voigtländer Bessa models have a double focal-plane shutter with two sets of curtains to prevent damage by the sun. Shutter speeds range from 1 to 1/2000 s and bulb (B), with flash sync at 1/125 s on hot-shoe or PC terminal. They all have TTL exposure metering, and manual exposure; the recent R2A and R3A also have an aperture priority automatic mode.

Bessa-L and Bessa-T (finderless)

The first model was the Bessa-L, introduced in 1999. This was a finderless body with a Leica screw mount. It was introduced with a range of Voigtländer 39 mm screw lenses that were quite inexpensive and said to be of excellent quality. It could of course mount all the wide variety of 39 mm screw lenses by manufacturers as diverse as Leica, Canon, Nikon and even cheaper but often excellent Soviet lenses.

The Bessa-L was mostly intended to be used with ultra wide angle lenses, with which the absence of a focusing device is not a problem. Most notably Voigtländer introduced a 15 mm and a 12 mm lens, the latter being the widest rectilinear full-frame lens ever marketed up to then.

The Bessa-L has TTL metering with LED readout on the back edge of the top plate with an ASA range of 25–1600 and an EV range 1 to 19 at ASA 100. The readout consists of two red arrows pointing to a green light in between to indicate over, under, or correct exposure. 

On some markets, the Voigtländer Bessa-L was sold as the Cosina 107-SW.

The Bessa-L was supplemented in 2001 by the Bessa-T, which used the Leica M-mount, could receive a trigger advance design, and had an integrated rangefinder with high magnification, but no viewfinder. It was sold in silver or black; from 2002, also in gray or olive (at a higher price and perhaps only in Japan). It is now discontinued but some stock is still available.

In 2001, the Bessa-T was sold in a special kit, called Heliar 101st Anniversary (in short "T101"), with a 50 mm f:3.5 collapsible Heliar lens, for the anniversary of the Voigtländer Heliar lens design. It existed in black, grey, olive and blue: five hundred numbered examples were produced for each color.

Bessa-R and Bessa R2 (manual rangefinder)

The Bessa-R, introduced in 2000, was a rangefinder camera with a projected frame finder and a Leica screw mount. Although considerably cheaper than a Leica M camera, its viewfinder was comparable in function and feeling. It featured manually selectable frames for 35 mm/90 mm, 50 mm, and 75 mm lenses. The body, made of polycarbonate plastics, was not comparable to that of a Leica but was solid enough. All in all it was an inexpensive, all-manual rangefinder with TTL metering at a significantly lower price than a comparably equipped Leica M camera. It was available in black or silver; from 2002, also in navy blue or olive (at a higher price and perhaps only in Japan).

The Bessa R2 replaced the Bessa-R in 2002. It was an updated version, with a Leica M-mount replacing the Leica screw mount, and the ability to take the same trigger advance accessory as the Bessa-T. Its quality of fabrication and overall finish was much better than the R, with magnesium alloy replacing the former model's plastic plates and a more substantial cast (as opposed to pressed) metal film rewind lever. The changes resulted in a more solid and marginally larger camera, available in either olive (with chrome detailing) or splatter-textured black paint finishes. The Bessa-R's self-timer was deleted from the R2, possibly due to the packaging constraints imposed on the design by the adoption of thicker metal panels.

Rollei 35 RF

The names Cosina, Voigtländer and Bessa appear nowhere on the Rollei 35 RF (2002), marketed not by Cosina but instead by Rollei Fototechnic. But this camera is very obviously based on the Bessa R2. The most obvious differences are the price (much higher) and somewhat gaudy appearance; more importantly the framelines are for 40, 50, and 80 mm. Arguably it remains the best Bessa camera for people who wear glasses and primarily use a 40 mm lens.

Bessa-R2S and Bessa-R2C (Nikon and Contax mount)

The Bessa-R2S and Bessa-R2C are special versions of the Bessa R2, introduced in 2002, the Bessa-R2S having a Nikon rangefinder mount and the Bessa-R2C a Contax rangefinder mount.

At about the time in 2005 when discontinuation of these two models was announced, the Bessa-R2S was also available in a "Nikon Historical Society" (NHS) version with special paintwork and a rigid version of the Heliar  50 mm lens sold earlier with the Bessa-T. The set was available to the general public through regular retail channels in the US: Society membership was not required.

Bessa R2A and R3A (auto-exposure rangefinder)

The Bessa R2A and Bessa R3A were introduced in 2004 and discontinued in 2013. They were updated versions of the Bessa R2, with the Leica M-mount and an aperture-priority automatic exposure, switchable to manual. The R2A has a finder with a 0.7x magnification, and 35/50/75/90 frame lines. The R3A has a finder with a 1x magnification, and 40/50/75/90 frame lines. Both can take the trigger advance accessory.

They were sold in textured black or flat grey paint finishes.

These cameras feature an electronic shutter, making the camera inoperable without batteries.

Bessa R2M and R3M (manual rangefinder)
The Bessa R2M and Bessa R3M, both announced in Germany around March 2006 and in May elsewhere, are the current, manual-exposure, mechanical-shutter equivalents of the R2A and R3A.

A special 250th Anniversary Set, sold with a 50 mm  M-mount collapsible Heliar lens, was also announced.
They were sold in black (1000 examples of the R3M, 500 of the R2M) or silver (700 of the R3M, 300 of the R2M).

The Bessa R3m has a 1x viewfinder and 40/50/75/90 framelines. The internal meter requires batteries to operate but since the camera is mechanical it can still take pictures with no batteries.

Bessa R4M and R4A (wide-angle rangefinder)
Announced in October, 2006 at photokina, the Bessa R4M and Bessa R4A were the first Leica M-mount cameras to include framelines wider than 28 mm. The R4-series keeps the same features as the R3-series, but utilizes a wide-angle-specific viewfinder with .52x magnification and framelines for 21, 25, 28, 35, and 50 mm lenses. Like the previous limited edition R-series cameras, the R4A features aperture-priority autoexposure, while the R4M features full manual operation, including a mechanical shutter that will continue to work even if the battery (which powers the meter) is dead.

The R4M is available in the classic black of the R2 and R3-series, while the R4A is available in matte black.

Notes

External links
Bessa-L by Alfred Klomp
Bessa-R by Mike Elek
An unofficial Voigtländer FAQ, edited by Peat Bakke
Cosina Voigtländer Cosina's own site (in Japanese)
Ringphoto Voigtländer (in German)
 Stephen Gandy is the US importer of the Bessa and maintains informative pages at Cameraquest
 The entry in the Leica FAQ
 Peter Wolff's Bessa R2 review
 User reviews at PhotographyReview.com
 Lionel's Voigtländer Bessa-R overview at 35mm-compact.com

Images
 Bessa-R sample photos at pbase.com
 Bessa R2 sample photos at pbase.com
 Bessa R tag at flickr.com
 Bessa R2 Gallery Peter Chou's Bessa R2 Gallery

References
"Bessa-R2S 'NHS' kinen moderu ga Amerika de hatsubai". (ベッサR2S「NHS」記念モデルがアメリカで発売, Bessa-R2S "NHS" commemorative model for sale in America). KKS076 P. 96.

Bessa